Kathryn Mary Wilkins (born 17 May 1976) is an English former cricketer who played as an all-rounder. She was a right-handed batter and right-arm off break bowler. She appeared in three One Day Internationals for England in July 1999, scoring 66 runs and taking four wickets. She also represented England at under-21 and under-23 levels. She played domestic cricket for West of England and Somerset.

References

External links
 
 

1976 births
Living people
Cricketers from Bristol
England women One Day International cricketers
Somerset women cricketers
Somerset women cricket captains